The South Midlands League was a football league covering Bedfordshire and some adjoining counties in England. It was founded in 1922 as the Bedfordshire County League and merged with the Spartan League in 1997 to form the Spartan South Midlands League.

History
The league was formed in 1922 as the Bedfordshire County League, beginning with eight clubs; Arlesey Town, Biggleswade & District Reserves, Leighton United, Letchworth Town, Luton Clarence Reserves, RAF Henlow, Stotfold Athletic and Waterlows Athletic. In 1924 the league was renamed the Bedfordshire & District County League. A second division was added in 1925, and in 1929 it was renamed the South Midlands League.

Division Two had only six clubs in 1930–31 and 1931–32, and was not played in 1932–33. However, it was reintroduced for the 1933–34 season with nine clubs, all but two of which were reserve teams.

The league was abandoned in 1939 due to World War II, before returning for the 1946–47 season. In 1947 Division One was renamed the Premier Division and Division Two became Division One, with a new third division added, name Division Two. The league gained another division in 1949 when Division Two was split into Division Two A and B, with a play-off between the two division winners to determine the overall Division Two champions. The following season Division Two reverted to being a single division.

Division Two was abolished in 1955 after having shrunk to only eight clubs in 1954–55. The league then remained unchanged until 1993 when Division One was renamed the Senior Division and a new division (Division One) added as a third tier. In 1997 the league merged with the Spartan League to form the Spartan South Midlands League. The new league initially ran with two Premier Divisions (north and south), a Senior Division and two Division Ones (north and south).

During the evolution of the National League System, the league became a feeder to the Isthmian League, with clubs such as Leighton Town, Oxford City and Bedford Town earning promotion.

Although clubs from the league played in the qualifying rounds of the FA Cup from the late 1920s onwards, none ever reached the first round proper. The best performance came from Barton Rovers in 1976–77 when they reached the fourth qualifying round. South Midlands League clubs had more success in the FA Vase, with Barton Rovers reaching the final in 1977–78 and Arlesey Town winning the competition in 1994–95.

Divisional champions

Member teams

AC Delco Reserves
AC Sphinx
AC Sphinx Reserves
Abbey National
ACD Tridon
Addmult
AML
Ampthill Town
Apsley Guise
Arlesey Town
Arlesey Town Reserves
Ashcroft
Bagshawes
Baldock Town
Baldock Town Reserves
Barton Rovers
Batford Old Boys
Bedford Avenue Reserves
Bedford Corinthians
Bedford Eagles
Bedford North End
Bedford Queen's Works
Bedford Queen's Works Reserves
Bedford St Cuthbert's
Bedford St. Cuthbert's Reserves
Bedford Town
Bedford Town 'A'
Bedford Town Reserves
Bedford United
Bell Sports
Biggleswade & District Reserves
Biggleswade Town
Biggleswade Town Reserves
Biggleswade United
Biscot Sports
Bletchley Centre
Bletchley LMS
Bletchley Sports
Bletchley Sports Reserves
Bletchley Town
Bletchley Town Reserves
Bletchley United
Bondor
Borg Warner
Bow Brickhill
Brache Sparta
Bridger Packaging
Britannia Works
British Aircraft Corporation (Luton)
British Aircraft Corporation (Stevenage)
Brooklands
Buckingham Athletic
Buckingham Town
Buckingham United
Caddington
Cambridge Town Reserves
Chipperfield
Clifton Old Boys
Cranfield United
Cranfield United Reserves
Crawley Green Sports
De Havilland (Hatfield)
Dunstable Athletic
Dunstable Athletic Reserves
Dunstable Town Reserves
Dunstable United
Eaton Bray
Eaton Bray United
Electrolux
Elstow Abbey
Emberton
Esavian Sports
Eynesbury Rovers
Flamstead
Flitwick Athletic
Flitwick Rovers
GIF (Luton)
Hanslope
Harlington Stars
Harpenden Town
Harrold United
Hatfield Town
Haynes
Hemel Hempstead United
Henlow
Histon Institute Reserves
Hitchin Blue Cross
Hitchin Blue Cross Reserves
Hitchin Imps
Hitchin Town Reserves
Hoddesdon Town
Holmer Green
Houghton Regis
Houghton Town
Hunting Athletic
ICL Letchworth
Ickleford
Inter City
Karrier Motors
Kempston Rovers
Kent Athletic
Kettering Town Reserves
Knebworth
Kodak
Kryn & Lahy
Langford
Leagrave & District
Leagrave & District Reserves
Leighton Athletic
Leighton Marley
Leighton Town
Leighton United Reserves
Letchworth
Letchworth Town Reserves
Leverstock Green
Limbury Old Boys
London Brick
London Brick Reserves
London Colney
Lucas Sports
Luton Amateur
Luton Amateur Reserves
Luton Amateurs & Ramblers
Luton Amateurs & Ramblers Reserves
Luton Athletic
Luton Chapel Street Sports
Luton Clarence
Luton Clarence Reserves
Luton Davis Athletic
Luton Frickers Athletic
Luton Gas Works Athletic
Luton Hitchin Road Old Boys
Luton Kent's Athletic
Luton Kent's Athletic Reserves
Luton Old Boys
Luton Old Modernians
Luton Percival Athletic
Luton Ramblers
Luton Town 'B'
Luton Town Colts
Lynton Works
Marshmoor F.C.|Marshmoor
Marston Shelton Rovers
Marston Shelton Rovers Reserves
Marston Sports
Mercedes Benz
Milford Villa
Milton Keynes
Milton Keynes Borough
Milton Keynes County
Milton Keynes Town
Mowlem
Mursley United
Napier/English Electric
New Bradwell St Peter
Newport Pagnell Town
Old Bradwell United
Old Dunstablians
Old Lutonians
Oxford City
Peartree Old Boys
Peartree Old Boys Reserves
Pirton
Pitstone & Ivinghoe
Potters Bar Crusaders
Potters Bar Town
Potton United
Pye Radio
RAF Cardington
RAF Henlow
RAF Henlow Reserves
Risborough Rangers
Roade
Rootes Sports
Royston Town
Rushden Sports
Rushden Town Reserves
Sandy Albion
Scot
Selby
Shefford Town
Shenley & Loughton
Shillington
Shredded Wheat
Shredded Wheat Reserves
Silsoe
SKF
Slip End United
St Neots & District
St Neots & District Reserves
St Neots St. Mary's
Steeple Claydon
Stevenage Town
Stevenage Town Reserves
Stewartby Works
Stewartby Works Reserves
Stony Stratford Sports
Stony Stratford Town
Stotfold
Stotfold Athletic
Stotfold Rovers
Thame United
The 61
Tickford Sports
Toddington Rovers
Totternhoe
Towcester Town
Tring Athletic
Vauxhall (Dunstable)
Vauxhall Motors
Vauxhall Motors 'A'
Vauxhall Motors Reserves
Waddesdon
Walden Rangers
Waterlows
Waterlows Reserves
Wellingborough Town Reserves
Welwyn Garden City
Welwyn Garden City Reserves
Welwyn Garden United
Westbourne Athletic
Wiltonians
Wingate & Finchley
Wingate
Winslow United
Wolverton
Wolverton Town Reserves
Wootton Blue Cross
Wootton Blue Cross Reserves

References

 
Defunct football leagues in England
 South
1922 establishments in England
1997 disestablishments in England